Szabolcs Detre (March 7, 1947) is a Hungarian Sailor. He won the Olympic Bronze Medal  in 1980 Summer Olympics in  Flying Dutchman class  along with his brother Zsolt Detre.

Early life
His father was László Detre (an astronomer). His daughter is Diána Detre (a windsurfer).

References

1947 births
Living people
Olympic sailors of Hungary
Hungarian male sailors (sport)
Sailors at the 1980 Summer Olympics – Flying Dutchman
Olympic bronze medalists for Hungary
Olympic medalists in sailing
Medalists at the 1980 Summer Olympics